Dali man is the remains of a late Homo erectus or archaic Homo sapiens who lived in the late-mid Pleistocene epoch. The remains comprise a complete fossilized skull, which was discovered by Liu Shuntang in 1978 in Dali County, Shaanxi Province, China.

Dating the skull is a matter of debate.
The fossil is considered to be the most complete skull of that time period found in China.

Access to Dali Man is restricted. The cranium is currently housed in the Institute of Vertebrate Paleontology and Paleoanthropology in Beijing, China.

Characteristics of the skull 
The Dali cranium is interesting to modern anthropologists as it is possibly a well-preserved example of archaic Homo sapiens; it has a mixture of traits from Homo erectus and Homo sapiens. However, the details of the face and skull are distinct from European Neanderthals and earlier European hominids, such as remains found in Petralona cave and Atapuerca.

Vault
The skull is low and long, though the posterior end of the skull is rounded, unlike the contemporary broad-based H. erectus or top-wide skull of modern humans. It does however bear a prominent sagittal keel, a trait found in H. erectus but in few modern humans. The brain appears to have been sitting mainly behind the face, giving an extremely low forehead. The cranial capacity is estimated to around 1 120 cc, at the lower end of the modern human range, and upper end of the H. erectus range. The base of the cranium is less robust than in H. erectus. The posterior margin lacks the heavy neck muscle attachment seen in that group. Unlike the distinct tubular form seen in H. erectus, the tympanic plate is thin and foreshortened, a condition similar to that of modern humans.

Unlike H. erectus skulls, the Dali skull lacks the "pinched" look between the face and the cranial vault.

Face
The face is topped by massive brow ridges. The ridges curve over each eye, unlike the straight bar-like ridges seen at the Peking man material from Zhoukoudian. The curvature is more similar structurally to the brow ridges in archaic humans from Europe and Africa. The cheek bones are delicate, and the nasal bone flattened, again a curious combination of traits. During fossilization, the upper jaw has been fractured and dislocated upwards, giving the cranium the appearance of having a very short face. If reconstructed, the face would be probably be similar in overall dimensions to that of the Jinniushan woman skull.

Taxonomy

In March 1978, a surprisingly complete archaic human skull was unearthed by farmer Liu Shuntang in Dali County, Shaanxi in north-central China. It was formally described the following year by Chinese palaeoanthropologists Wang Yongyan and colleagues, who preliminarily characterised it as a late Middle Pleistocene transitional morph between Homo erectus (more specifically, the Chinese Peking Man) and the European Neanderthals. In 1981, Wu Xinzhi produced a much more substantial description of the specimen, and instead concluded it is a transitional morph between H. erectus and modern humans, coining the name "Homo sapiens daliensis". At this point in time, the Out of Africa hypothesis (that humans evolved in and dispersed out of Africa) was overturning the Out of Asia and multiregional hypotheses. In Western thought, Peking Man moved from the centre of human origins to a dead offshoot, while Chinese palaeoanthropologists repurposed the multiregional hypothesis wherein local archaic populations interbred with the ancestors of modern humans, thereby still being maintained as human ancestors. At this point, multiregional debates were accompanied by (occasionally racist) anatomical continuities between East Asian archaic and modern East Asian and Oceanian peoples. Wu grouped Dali Man with all late Middle Pleistocene skulls, including skulls from Dingcun, Jinniushan, and Yunxian, though he promptly deserted the nomen "H. s. daliensis". Thus, these specimens were often simply referred to as just "archaic H. sapiens".

The 2010 sequencing of the genetic code of an unidentified human species from Denisova Cave, Siberia, propagated suppositions that the Dali Man and East Asian contemporaries represent these enigmatic "Denisovans", but this is impossible to confirm as Denisovans are only identifiable from DNA instead of any diagnostic anatomical features.

At around this time, the nomen Homo heidelbergensis was regaining popularity, being largely assigned to various Middle Pleistocene African and European specimens. Some authors additionally lumped contemporary East Asian remains into it, including Dali, first suggested by anthropologists Aurélien Mounier, Silvana Condemi, and Giorgio Manzi in 2011. In 2016, Manzi recommended resurrecting Wu's nomen as "H. heidelbergensis daliensis" for Middle Pleistocene East Asian specimens.

In 2021, Chinese paleoanthropologist Qiang Ji and colleagues erected a new species, Homo longi, based on a late Middle Pleistocene skull from Harbin in northeastern China. They suggested Denisovans may belong to H. longi, but excluded Dali Man and contemporaneous East Asian specimens. They instead recommended reviving H. daliensis to accommodate these specimens. In a study published the same day, Israeli anthropologist Israel Hershkovitz and colleagues suggested the apparent diversity of supposedly unique forms during the Middle Pleistocene is the result of a complex network of cross-continental interbreeding, based on the 140 to 120 thousand years old Israeli Nesher Ramla remains which feature a mix of Neanderthal and H. erectus traits.

Other possible Dali-type finds
An assortment of primitive Homo skulls have tentatively been placed with the Dali find. The Maba Man, a 120 to 140 000 year old fragmentary skull from Guangdong in China shows the same general contours of the forehead. A partial female skeleton with skull from Jinniushan (also China) seems to belong to the same group, characterized by a very robust skull cap but less robust skull base. A possibly fourth member could be the Narmada skull from the Madhya Pradesh in India, consisting of a single robust cranial vault.

The Denisova hominin, represented originally by a very robust finger bone found in the Altai mountains in Russia, and to which especially the find of a partial mandible in the Baishiya Karst Cave on the Tibetan Plateau in China was later added, are still in discussion if they might be linked to the Dali people (see Denisovan §Specimens). DNA studies show the Denisovans with Mitochondrial DNA linking them to a very deep split in the human tree. This would make the DNA erectus rather than heidelbergensis or other more recent splits. However, the analysis of the nuclear DNA points to a sister group relationship with the neanderthals. Thus, it is possible that the archaic humans in Asia were a mixture of neanderthal relatives and an already widespread Asian erectus population.

See also
 List of human evolution fossils
 Dragon Man (archaic human)

References 

Homo fossils
Homo sapiens fossils
Human remains (archaeological)
1978 archaeological discoveries